Otto Halfdan Treider (October 6, 1856 – April 6, 1928) was a Norwegian educator and preacher.

Treider was born in Drøbak. He founded the Otto Treider Business School (Otto Treiders handelsskole, now Treider College) in 1882. The institution soon became Norway's largest and leading business school.

As a preacher, Treider supported the Free Church movement and led a group known as the Treider Circle. In 1891 he built the Calmeyer Street Mission House in Oslo.

Treider died in Oslo.

References

External links
 Store norske leksikon: Otto Treider.

1856 births
1928 deaths
People from Frogn
Heads of schools in Norway
Norwegian Lutherans